Ian Matthews  (born 20 June 1971) is an English musician, best known as the drummer for the rock band Kasabian.

Prior to Kasabian, Matthews played with a number of noted local Bristol bands, such as K-Passa, CCQ, and Sissi. He met Kasabian in 2001 before the band were signed when they were recording demos in Bristol. From these early sessions Matthews recorded with them came the single "Processed Beats". He also played on "Butcher Blues" from Kasabian's self-titled debut album. He also overdubbed an extra drum track over the single version of "Cutt Off", and recorded the drums to the B-side "Beneficial Herbs". He was asked to tour with them in April 2004 and became a permanent member in April 2005.

Matthews started his career as a young club/jazz drummer and when not touring or recording with Kasabian, he often plays small jazz/funk gigs in and around Bristol. He has recorded with Bristol artist James Morton's Porkchop on Don't You Worry 'Bout That album.

He cites Mitch Mitchell, Tony Williams and Buddy Rich as his strongest drumming influences.

In 2015, Matthews joined with Al Murray, Keith Keough, Stuart Warmington and Al Kitching in founding the British Drum Company.

Drum kits 
Matthews has used various drum kits and cymbals over the years. Currently he is using British Drum Co Drums, Zildjian cymbals Remo Drum Heads, Vic Firth Sticks and Natal percussion.

Trivia 
Matthews is left-handed. He broke his left hand when touring with Kasabian in Europe in February 2010 and was replaced by his drum technician Laurie Jenkins for a show and the NME Awards performance of "Vlad the Impaler".

He got his first drum kit when he was four and by the time he was seven, he played his first gig in a pub and was capable of laying "a pretty good waltz, quickstep, foxtrot, and tango".

In addition to his work with Kasabian, he has also recorded drums on the following: Soundisciples - Audio Manifesto (2002), Ilya - They Died for Beauty (2003), Bruce Parry Presents Amazon Tribe: Songs for Survival - track 9 with Skin at Robot Club feat. the Adi Tribe - "Simmer Down" (2008), BBC Earth Unplugged series Earth Files Ep2 "Salmon Strike" and Ep5 "Xmas Special" (2012), soundtrack to I Give It a Year (2013) and on the soundtrack to Fast and Furious 6 (2013).

References

External links 
 Kasabian.co.uk
 Interview with iDrum magazine, issue 6

1971 births
Living people
British male drummers
English rock drummers
Musicians from Bristol
Kasabian members
21st-century drummers